Jeremy Hugh Winston (20 May 1954 – 21 November 2011) was an Anglican priest. He served as vicar of Abergavenny from 1993 until 2011, and briefly as Dean of Monmouth during 2011.

Early life
Winston was born in 1954 in Middlesex but moved, with his mother and brother, on the premature death of his father, to the family home in Griffithstown. He was educated at Griffithstown Primary School and Croesyceiliog Grammar School, where he became Head Boy, and then went as a music scholar to Trinity College, Carmarthen. He graduated with a B.Ed. and trained to be a teacher. He taught for a while in Llanelli Grammar School before turning to the priesthood. He studied at King's College London and at St Stephen's House, Oxford.

Clerical career 
He was  ordained in 1980. After a curacy at St Basil, Bassaleg he was vicar of St Arvans with Penterry (Chepstow), before being appointed vicar of Abergavenny in 1993. He was appointed Area Dean of Abergavenny in 2002, and in the same year a canon of St Woolos Cathedral; and in 2011, shortly before his death, he was installed as Dean of Monmouth. He was also a director of the Friends of Friendless Churches.

Winston had been due to start treatment for a brain tumour on the day he died.

References

1954 births
People from Monmouthshire
People educated at Croesyceiliog Grammar School
People associated with Trinity University College
Alumni of King's College London
Alumni of St Stephen's House, Oxford
Deans of Monmouth
2011 deaths